Aarón Sánchez Alburquerque (born 5 June 1996) is an Andorran footballer who plays as a forward for Atlètic Club d'Escaldes.

External links 
 
 

1996 births
Living people
Association football midfielders
Andorran footballers
Andorra international footballers
Andorra youth international footballers
Spanish footballers
Footballers from Castile and León
Sportspeople from Salamanca
Spanish people of Andorran descent
People with acquired Andorran citizenship